Mockham Down is the site of an Iron Age hill fort close to Brayfordhill in Devon, England.

References

Hill forts in Devon